Astroŭna is a village in Belarus. It is located in the Beshankovichy District of Vitebsk Region, 15 km west of Vitebsk. Astroŭna is a birthplace of Lew Sapieha, statesman of the Polish–Lithuanian Commonwealth and creator of the Third Lithuanian Statute.

History 

The village was founded as a castle of Ivan Sapieha between years 1520 and 1530. At that time the land belonged to Palonnaja manor of Vitebsk paviet of the Grand Duchy of Lithuania and was inherited by Ivan and his brother Janush from their mother, duchess Feodora Druck-Sakalinskaja. In 1546 a village was founded near the castle. For the next hundred years or so Astroŭna was a property of Sapieha family.

In 1622 a Dominican monastery was founded by Alexander Sapieha. After his death part of the manor was inherited by his daughter Anna and her husband Stanislaw Narushevich.

In 1772, Astroŭna became a part of the Russian Empire in the course of the First Partition of Poland. In 1812, the Battle of Ostrovno took place on the outskirts of the village between the French and Russian armies.

At the end of the 19th century there were about 70 houses in the village, in the beginning of the 20th century — about 120 houses. After the October Revolution, Astroŭna became a part of the Belarusian SSR.

Since the independence of Belarus in 1991, it has been a village in Beshankovichy Raion, Belarus. In 2005, Astroŭna joined the state program for rural development and became an agrotown.

Notable residents 

Lew Sapieha (1557, Astroŭna estate (now village) – 1633), a nobleman and statesman of the Polish–Lithuanian Commonwealth and governor of Slonim, Brest and Mahiliow

References

External links 

 Photos of Astroŭna at globus.tut.by
 Photos of Astroŭna at radzima.org
 

Villages in Belarus
Agrotowns in Belarus
Populated places in Vitebsk Region
Beshankovichy District
Vitebsk Voivodeship
Sennensky Uyezd